Neon Ballroom is the third studio album by Australian alternative rock band Silverchair, released in 1999 by record labels Murmur and Epic. The songs "Anthem for the Year 2000", "Ana's Song (Open Fire)" and "Miss You Love" were released as singles and a short film was released for the song "Emotion Sickness". Neon Ballroom debuted at No. 1 on the Australian albums chart and peaked at No. 50 on the US Billboard 200 chart. It was also their most successful album on the UK Albums Chart, where it peaked at No. 29. The album was nominated for 10 ARIA Awards and was certified Triple Platinum by the ARIA for selling over 210,000 copies in Australia. The album has been described as "heavy rock with orchestral flourishes and synthetic touches with powerfully emotional lyrics" that reflects the personal demons of frontman Daniel Johns, due to the band's rapid international success.

Background, writing and recording 
From May 1998, Silverchair worked on their third studio album, Neon Ballroom, with Nick Launay (The Birthday Party, Models, Midnight Oil) producing again. The band had originally intended to take a 12-month-break after the release of 1997's  Freak Show, but in the end they decided to devote their time to making new music.

In 1999, Johns announced that he had developed the eating disorder, anorexia nervosa, due to anxiety. Johns noted that the lyrics to "Ana's Song (Open Fire)" dealt with his disorder ("And Ana wrecks your life/like an anorexia life"), where he would "eat what he needed [...] to stay awake." He revealed that his eating problems developed from the time of Freak Show and when Neon Ballroom was written he "hated music, really everything about it", but felt that he "couldn't stop doing it; I felt like a slave to it." Johns sought therapy and medication but felt "It's easier for me to express it through music and lyrics".

Johns said the album was approached differently compared to the band's previous records: "The first two albums were written with the music being second to something else – like school, and everything else that teenagers go through. My mind was on many things, and music was just one of them. On this album, music was the only thing I was doing and the only thing that I had to concentrate on. I approached it differently in that all of the songs were written as poetry. In three months I wrote about 112 poems, and I made a collage out of the poems, and turned the words that meant the most to me into songs. Then I wrote the music around words, rather than writing the words around the music."

Drummer Ben Gillies said about the writing process, "In our year off, [Johns] turned into a hermit, we didn't see him that much. Me and Chris were keeping normal hours, and surfing and hanging out with mates. I didn't really think about the writing, I was just thinking about having a good time. I did have a hand in two songs, though "Spawn Again" which was actually for the movie Spawn, and "Trash" which is kind of heavy, a fast, punky one, but it didn't make the album, I am going to try and be more involved with the writing on the next album. This time I was just lapping up the great atmosphere here in Newcastle." However, Gillies would not end up contributing to the songwriting on the follow-up, Diorama, with Johns writing all of the songs.

Content 
Neon Ballroom was an overhaul of the band's musical style found on its first two albums, Frogstomp and Freak Show. "Anthem for the Year 2000", for example, retained much of the band's youthful rock energy but featured a new rock song structure and various electronic effects. Eight years after the album's release, Silverchair frontman Daniel Johns said: "To me, I honestly feel like our first record was Neon Ballroom. I've never felt any different. I don't feel like our first two albums were Silverchair: that's our teenage high school band. I don't like them at all. I listen to them and go, 'That's cute', especially the first one, because Frogstomp we were 14. But the second one we're like 16, I'm like 'You're getting older. You're running out of chances'".

"Spawn Again" dates back to 1996, originally considered for the band's Freak Show album. It was recorded under the original title "Spawn" when demoing tracks for Neon Ballroom and included, in remixed form by hip-hop group Vitro on the 1997 soundtrack to the film Spawn, adding various electronic elements to the track. A "Pre-Vitro" mix of the same recording was also released on the Neon Ballroom Limited Edition bonus disc, Volume 1 in 2000, and the Rarities 1994–1999 compilation in 2002.

The Neon Ballroom album version is a complete re-recording of the song, re-titled "Spawn Again", featuring additional lyrics, specifically an entire verse adding to the animal liberation narrative. The album recording of "Anthem for the Year 2000" is a different mix on the Australian release than the one found on other releases (including singles). "Satin Sheets" was originally called "Punk Song #3" (and was a contender for Freak Show) and "Paint Pastel Princess" was "All the Same to Me".

Johns wrote all the songs on the album except "Spawn Again" which he co-wrote with Gillies.

Release 
Neon Ballroom was released on 8 March 1999 on Sony Records imprint Murmur. The album debuted at number 1 on the ARIA Albums Chart, and was certified 4× platinum by ARIA. It was also certified Gold in the United States. Neon Ballroom outsold Freak Show in North America and throughout the world. To date it has sold a total of 2 million albums worldwide. The album charted in Canada, where it peaked at No. 5. It reached the top 40 on the United Kingdom Albums Chart.

The album has also been issued in gatefold cover vinyl, limited edition cassette and 180 gram vinyl in 2010, as well as in a double pack with Freak Show. On initial release in the UK, Neon Ballroom was issued as a limited edition with a bonus enhanced CD (see track listing).

Neon Ballroom provided three Australian top 20 singles: "Anthem for the Year 2000", "Ana's Song (Open Fire)" and "Miss You Love"; a fourth single, "Paint Pastel Princess", did not reach the top 50. "Ana's Song (Open Fire)" peaked at No. 12 on the Billboard Hot Modern Rock Tracks. A vinyl version of the album was limited to 5,000 copies worldwide. In Europe and South America it became the group's most successful album to date. Rolling Stone's Neva Chonin attributed their chart success to the album's more "mature" sound.

After the release of Neon Ballroom, Silverchair's three-album contract with Sony Music had ended. The group eventually signed with Atlantic Records for North and South America, and formed their own label, Eleven: A Music Company (distributed by EMI), with their manager, John Watson for Australia and Asia.

Critical reception 

Electric Music Online, who gave it a score of 91%, wrote a highly positive review of the album, and picked "Satin Sheets" and "Miss You Love" as the record's best songs.

Sun-Sentinel writer Marc Weinroth heavily praised Silverchair's ballads on Neon Ballroom, as well as the use of an orchestra on many of the album's songs.<ref>{{Cite web|url=https://www.sun-sentinel.com/news/fl-xpm-1999-07-09-9907070555-story.html |title=Silverchair Shines in Neon Ballroom'''s Ballads |first=Marc|last=Weinroth|website=Sun-Sentinel|access-date=8 April 2020}}</ref>

Australian rock music historian Ian McFarlane said "as well as being the band's best album to date, it was universally acknowledged as one of the best albums of the year."<ref
name="McF"/>

German music magazine Rock Hard gave the album a positive score of 8.5 out of 10.

Legacy
In 2019, David James Young of Australian website Junkee wrote that Silverchair "rarely felt more alive than on Neon Ballroom" and that "it's not the sound of a band aping its heroes — it's the sound of a band shedding its skin; an ugly but nonetheless necessary process of evolution". Young also complimented Silverchair's use of an orchestra on the album, as it "feels vital to these moments on the record, adding further dramatic tension to a record that's already thriving off of it." About the mixed reception it received from some critics, Young wrote: "With 20 years of hindsight, however — not to mention eight full years of Silverchair being spoken of in the past tense — there's a chance for those that may not have understood exactly where Neon Ballroom was coming from to reevaluate it under a new light. Consider that, when a lot of the criticisms were made about Neon Ballroom, it was from the viewpoint of being the most recent studio album for a still-active band."
 
The music website Concrete Playground ranked Neon Ballroom the 27th best Australian album.  The American online magazine Loudwire had two songs from the record, "Anthem for the Year 2000" and "Ana's Song (Open Fire)" on its list "50 Rock Songs That Defined 1999". Loudwire also included Neon Ballroom on the list "15 Best Hard Rock Albums of 1999". Australian radio station Double J ranked the album number 7 on its ranking of "The 50 Best Australian Albums of the '90s".

British magazine Kerrang! featured Neon Ballroom on the magazine's list of "The 50 Best Albums from 1999".

In October 2010, the album was listed at number 25 in the book 100 Best Australian Albums''.

Touring 
Silverchair added an auxiliary keyboardist, Sam Holloway (ex-Cordrazine), for the Neon Ballroom Tour. The US leg had the group playing with The Offspring and Red Hot Chili Peppers, while Silverchair's tour of UK and the rest of Europe had The Living End as the support act. The group appeared at festivals in Reading and Edgefest, amongst others.

Following the tour, the band announced that they would be taking a 12-month-break. Their only live performance in 2000 was at the Falls Festival on New Year's Eve. On 21 January 2001, the band played to 250,000 people at Rock in Rio, a show they described as the highlight of their career.

Track listing

Release history 
 8 March 1999 – Australia
 16 March 1999 – North America

Charts

Weekly

Year-end charts

Certifications

Personnel 

Silverchair
 Daniel Johns – vocals, guitar
 Ben Gillies – drums
 Chris Joannou – bass

Additional personnel
 David Helfgott – piano (track 1)
 Larry Muhoberac – piano arrangement (track 1)
 Robert Woolf – piano (track 5)
 Chris Abrahams – piano (track 8)
 Jane Rosenson – harp (track 8)
 Sweep (Johns' dog) – guest vocal (track 12)
 Paul Mac – keyboards (tracks 2, 4, 10, 12)
 Jim Moginie – keyboards (tracks 2, 3, 5, 6, 7, 9, 11)
 Jane Scarpantoni – cello, string arrangements
 John Harding, Fiona Ziegler, Carl Pini, Alexandra d'Elia, Leoni Ziegler, Emma Hayes, Georges Lentz – violin
 Leah Jennings – cello
 George Torbay – conductor (track 2)

Technical personnel
 Nick Launay – production
 Kevin Shirley – mixing (tracks 2, 5)

References 

Sources
 
 
 
  Note: Archived [on-line] copy has limited functionality.
 

1999 albums
Silverchair albums
Murmur (record label) albums
Albums produced by Nick Launay